Billboard magazine has published charts ranking the top-performing country music songs in the United States since 1944.  The first country chart was published under the title Most Played Juke Box Folk Records in the issue of the magazine dated January 8, 1944, and tracked the songs most played in the nation's jukeboxes.  The first number one was the song "Pistol Packin' Mama", different recordings of which were bracketed together and treated as one entry.  Billboard added a second chart in 1947 based on retail sales, and a third in 1949 based on radio airplay.  The jukebox chart was discontinued in 1957, and the following year, the remaining two charts were dropped and replaced with a chart, initially entitled Hot C&W Sides, which combined sales and airplay data into one overall ranking.  The chart was renamed Hot Country Singles in 1962, Hot Country Singles and Tracks in 1990, and Hot Country Songs in 2005.  In 1990, its methodology changed to use only airplay data from country music radio stations.  In 2012, this changed again to use data from stations of all formats as well as sales and streaming information.  At the same time, a new Country Airplay chart was introduced, which continued the former methodology of tracking plays on country stations only.

In the late 1940s and early 1950s, Eddy Arnold was the biggest star in country music and set several chart records, one of which endured for more than 60 years. His 1947 song "I'll Hold You in My Heart (Till I Can Hold You in My Arms)" spent a total of 21 weeks at number one, a record that would be equaled twice over the next decade but not broken until 2013. He gained 28 number-one songs, a record that would stand until 1980, when it was broken by Conway Twitty, who ultimately gained 40 number ones. George Strait broke Twitty's record in 2006 and by 2021 had achieved 44 chart-toppers. Long runs at number one became increasingly uncommon after the 1960s; in the entirety of the 1980s, no song spent longer than three weeks in the top spot, and in 1986 there was a different song at number one every week. This changed, however, in the 21st century, especially after the change in methodology of Hot Country Songs in 2012.  The record for the longest-running country number one was broken by "Cruise" by Florida Georgia Line, which spent 24 weeks atop the Hot Country Songs chart in 2012 and 2013, a figure subsequently exceeded by "Body Like a Back Road" by Sam Hunt (34 weeks in 2017) and "Meant to Be" by Bebe Rexha and Florida Georgia Line (50 weeks in 2017 and 2018). The songs that have topped the chart have reflected the evolution of the country music genre over the decades. The honky-tonk style of the 1940s and 1950s was overtaken in the 1960s by the "Nashville Sound", a smoother style with a broader appeal. In the 1970s, the country-pop style increasingly enabled country artists to achieve success on the pop music charts, and in more recent decades, some of the most successful songs have incorporated elements of hip hop music.

Chart history
Each entry in the "Year" column links to the list of number ones for that particular year.

See also
 List of artists who reached number one on the U.S. Hot Country chart
 List of Billboard number-one country albums

References

External links
Current Hot Country chart
Current Country Airplay chart